The siege of Sarai (July - August 1420) was a siege of Sarai, the nominal capital of the Golden Horde.

Background

After the death of Yeremferden both Dawlat Berdi and Olugh Mokhammad sought control of the Golden Horde. Berdi, who was Yeremferden's son, found himself limited to the Crimea. Mokhammad, on the other hand, held Sarai and had recently gained control of the Nogai Horde, raising his status immeasurably. In addition, Mokhammad had defeated Dawlat's soldiers in several small skirmishes. In retaliation, Berdi marched on Sarai in July 1420.

Siege

Sarai was poorly defended at the time and Mokhammad found himself ill-prepared for an attack. In early August he mustered his forces and managed to break the siege long enough to escape. Berdi's forces subsequently occupied the city.

Aftermath

Mokhammad fled to his Nogai vassals, where he still held power, and Berdi's esteem within the Horde grew. however, this was short lived; only two years later Baraq would defeat both Berdi and Mokhammad and take control of the Horde himself.

References
 Martin, Janet. Medieval Russia, 980-1584, Cambridge University Press, 1996.

Sarai
Sarai
1420 in Europe
Conflicts in 1420